Calvin Abueva (born February 4, 1988) is a Filipino professional basketball player for the Magnolia Hotshots of the Philippine Basketball Association (PBA). He was picked second overall by the Alaska Aces during the 2012 PBA Draft. He was nicknamed "The Beast" due to the all-around threat he brings at both ends of the court, he dominated the nation's collegiate ranks by posting excellent numbers during his tenure with the San Sebastian College – Recoletos Stags in the NCAA. He also became the first player in collegiate basketball history to lead a college league in points,
rebounds, and assists. Due to his versatility, him being frequently listed between 6'2 or 6'3, and his position as an undersized power forward for the Aces, Abueva has been frequently compared to the legendary import Sean Chambers.

College and amateur career
Abueva studied at the San Sebastian College. He started his collegiate career in NCAA playing for the Stags in 2009. Abueva caught national acclaim as Jimbo Aquino’s key support when the San Sebastian Stags coached by Ato Agustin held off the San Beda Red Lions to claim the NCAA title in 2009. When Aquino moved out of SSC, he amply took over. He became the leader of a menacing trio that also consisted of Ronald Pascual and Ian Sangalang.  He won the Most Valuable Player award during the 87th season of the NCAA by leading the league in scoring (20.6), rebounding (13.7), and was fourth in assists (3.9) although he also had an alarming league-high 5.6 turnovers.

In his 4th and final year in the NCAA, Abueva was a shoo-in to win his second and rare back-to-back MVP award. He performed beyond reality as he made numerous dominating performances.

He recorded 16 double-double's and 4 triple-double's, a league record but on August 25, 2012 in game against Lyceum, Abueva punched Lyceum's Vence Laude at the back of the head during a scuffle with 6:08 minutes left in the third quarter. He was then merited a disqualifying foul. A disqualifying foul automatically merits a one-game suspension. But worse, the suspension meted on the league's best player makes him ineligible to win any individual award this season If not for the misconduct, Alaska's No. 2 pick in the recent PBA draft would have handily won the MVP derby as he leads the current statistical race by a wide margin.

NCAA career statistics
Source:

|-
| align="left" | 2011
| align="left" | 
| 22 || 29.0 || .411 || .265 || .726 ||  style="background:#cfecec;"| 13.7 || 3.9 || .7 || .6 || style="background:#cfecec;"| 20.6
|-
| align="left" | 2012
| align="left" | 
| 17 || 33.0 || .364 || .216 || .724 ||  style="background:#cfecec;"| 16.4 || style="background:#cfecec;"|  6.5 || 1.2 || 1.6 || style="background:#cfecec;"| 20.1

Abueva played for the NLEX Road Warriors in the PBA Developmental League. Playing with the talent-laden Road Warriors, he helped NLEX to win three straight championships.

Professional career

Alaska Aces (2012–2018)

Early years

Abueva was not able to suit up in Alaska's first three assignments as he still needed to finish his duties with his school in the NCAA. In his highly anticipated debut game, Abueva made an immediate impact as he came through with a beastly performance against the Petron Blaze Boosters. Still smarting from his alma mater's NCAA final four loss to Letran 4 days before, he showed that he definitely is ready for the big leagues, finishing with 12 points and 16 rebounds in just 27 minutes.

Early in the season, he was one of the front-runners for the Best Player of the Conference title in the 2013 PBA conferences. Despite leading the statistical points in the past 2013 Philippine Cup and 2013 Commissioner's Cup conferences, he did not gain the Best Player of the Conference award.  Nevertheless, his stellar performance in the first two conferences put him on the Rookie-MVP discussion, in which was only achieved by Benjie Paras. He was a big factor for the Alaska Aces' in winning the 2013 PBA Commissioner's Cup Championship. However, a dip in his performance as well as Alaska's quick exit in the season-ending Governors' Cup has eroded his claim to both awards.

Abueva was still awarded as the 2012–13 PBA Rookie of the Year despite the season ending struggles.

Abueva's struggles seemed to continue towards the next season. He felt that his penchant for fouling out and getting into foul trouble early in the game limited his chances of helping the Aces down the stretch on most of their games. Although Abueva claims he had tried to taper off his overeagerness on the defensive-end so he can stay out of foul trouble.

His coach Luigi Trillo, however, had different take. He felt Abueva may have been “shackled” this season compared to last, thinking that teams may have allowed Abueva to play his game last season. He felt that team's may have found ways to neutralize "The Beast" after trying to study his game. Pointing that after having a monstrous debut, teams' started to try to figure him out.

Despite the seeming limitations, he still tried his best to contribute to help Alaska win. He averaged about 20 mins of playing time with 9.2 points, 7.2 rebounds and 1.8 assists; worse than his numbers last season.

True form
In his third season, Abueva started to become an "Angry Beast". His stats have well improved from the previous season. On October 28, 2014, he was instrumental in a comeback 100–98 win against the Talk 'N Text after trailing by as much as 18 points and hit the game-winning buzzer beater. He finished the game with 26 big points and a career high, 22 rebounds, making him the shortest PBA player to record 20+ rebounds in a single game. On November 11, 2014, he then again recorded another 20-20 performance in a win against the Kia Sorento, scoring 23 points and grabbing 21 rebounds. He started the 2014–15 PBA Philippine Cup averaging 15.33 rebounds per game as the fans compared him to Dennis Rodman for his rebounding skills and  suicidal hustle.

On May 13, 2016, Abueva was awarded the PBA Commissioner's Cup Best player of the conference award. He averaged 17.2 points, 7.6 rebounds,  2.8 assists and 1.4 steals in the tournament.

On October 14, 2016, Abueva was recognized during the PBA Leo Awards Night as he was named to the PBA Mythical First Team.

Phoenix Fuel Masters (2018–2020)
On August 7, 2018, Abueva was traded to the Phoenix Fuel Masters for Karl Dehesa and a 2019 first round draft pick. In his debut for the Fuel Masters against the Columbian Dyip back on August 22, 2018, Abueva came off the bench and recorded 12 points, 13 rebounds and 5 assists in just 23 minutes of playing time.

Abueva was suspended indefinitely and fined in June 2019 for two separate infractions; for the clothesline against TNT KaTropa import Terrence Jones and for doing obscene gestures to the girlfriend of Blackwater Elite player Bobby Parks Jr. Abueva's suspension lasted for about 16 months and there were multiple bids for Abueva to be able to rejoin Phoenix. In September 2019, Abueva was allowed to join Phoenix's practice sessions due to his gaining weight. Abueva was not able to join Phoenix for the 2019 season's Commissioner's and Governors' Cup.

For the 2020 season, Abueva is allowed to join Phoenix's, now known as the Phoenix Super LPG Fuel Masters, in its scrimmages, but was barred from playing in tune-up games and the pocket tournament the PBA team organized in preparation for the Philippine Cup in early 2020. The conference was postponed due to the COVID-19 pandemic giving Abueva time to formally rejoin. In July 2020, Abueva made public the moves he had to make for his suspension to be lifted including undergoing drug and psychological tests. Abueva's suspension was lifted in October 2020, enabling him to play games for Phoenix at the Philippine Cup which was restarted within a bubble format.

Magnolia Hotshots (2021–present)
On February 17, 2021, Abueva, along with the 2021 first round pick, was traded to the Magnolia Hotshots for Chris Banchero, 2021 first round pick and 2021 second round pick.

PBA career statistics

As of the end of 2021 season

Season-by-season averages 

|-
| align=left | 
| align=left | Alaska
| 51 || 26.4 || .384 || .262 || .630 || 9.5 || 1.8 || .9 || .8 || 12.3
|-
| align=left | 
| align=left | Alaska
| 42 || 20.8 || .332 || .148 || .641 || 7.2 || 1.8 || .9 || .4 || 9.2
|-
| align=left | 
| align=left | Alaska
| 57 || 22.9 || .447 || .138 || .647 || 8.9 || 2.3 || .9 || .5 || 12.9
|-
| align=left | 
| align=left | Alaska
| 58 || 25.6 || .437 || .333 || .648 || 8.5 || 2.5 || 1.1 || .5 || 15.4
|-
| align=left | 
| align=left | Alaska
| 28 || 26.4 || .455 || .253 || .591 || 8.7 || 2.3 || 1.3 || 1.1 || 15.8
|-
| align=left rowspan=2| 
| align=left | Alaska
| rowspan=2|29 || rowspan=2|24.4 || rowspan=2|.400 || rowspan=2|.282 || rowspan=2|.527 || rowspan=2|10.0 || rowspan=2|2.9 || rowspan=2|1.2 || rowspan=2|1.4 || rowspan=2|14.1
|-
| align=left | Phoenix
|-
| align=left | 
| align=left | Phoenix
| 19 || 27.9 || .333 || .260 || .622 || 11.7 || 3.3 || 1.3 || .8 || 14.8 
|-
| align=left | 
| align=left | Phoenix
| 12 || 35.0 || .456 || .290 || .712 || 11.3 || 5.2 || 1.7 || .7 || 15.4
|-
| align=left | 
| align="left" | Magnolia
| 34 || 30.0 || .430 || .308 || .730 || 8.8 || 2.3 || 1.0 || .9 || 14.5
|-class=sortbottom
| align=center colspan=2 | Career
| 330 || 25.5 || .411 || .278 || .636 || 9.0 || 2.4 || 1.1 || .7 || 13.5

Personal life
Calvin Abueva was born to a Filipina mother, Evelyn and African-American father, Calvin Sweeney. As a young boy in Angeles City, he followed a routine wherein he would watch his childhood idol Robert Jaworski on television at night and by noon the next day, he would mimic what he saw on television on the cement courts of Bayanihan Park. He observed how Jaworski became one of the PBA's best rebounders of all-time despite being a guard and tried his best to duplicate the legendary grit with his pals. Aside from basketball, Abueva also played volleyball during his childhood years. Calvin also has a younger brother, Richard Ramsey, who after being raised by foster parents after being left for adoption at the age of three months, finally met Calvin, mother Evelyn and his three other siblings in 2010. Like his brother, Richard also plays basketball, playing for De Ocampo Memorial College in Santa Mesa, Manila and currently serves as an assistant coach for the De Ocampo Cobras.

References

External links
 "Calvin Abueva Player Profile". PBA-Online!
 Philippine Basketball Association player profile
 
 
 
 Calvin Abueva at RealGM

1988 births
Living people
Alaska Aces (PBA) draft picks
Alaska Aces (PBA) players
Basketball players from Pampanga
FIBA 3x3 World Tour players
Filipino men's 3x3 basketball players
Filipino men's basketball players
Filipino people of African-American descent
Filipino Roman Catholics
Kapampangan people
Magnolia Hotshots players
Philippine Basketball Association All-Stars
Philippines men's national basketball team players
Phoenix Super LPG Fuel Masters players
Power forwards (basketball)
San Sebastian Stags basketball players
Small forwards
Sportspeople from Angeles City